"Handsome" is a song from English indie rock band the Vaccines. The track was released in the United Kingdom on 8 March 2015 as the lead single from the band's third studio album, English Graffiti (2015). The track received its premiere on BBC Radio 1 when it featured as Zane Lowe's Hottest Record in the World on 19 January. "Handsome" was written by Young, Cowan, Árnason and Robertson and produced by the band alongside David Fridmann and Cole MGN.

Track listing

Charts

Release history

References

2015 singles
The Vaccines songs
2014 songs
Columbia Records singles